Kushneria avicenniae is a Gram-negative and moderately halophilic bacterium from the genus of Kushneria which has been isolated from surface of leaves from the mangrove Avicennia germinans.

References

Oceanospirillales
Bacteria described in 2007